In 1800, the territory that would later become Argentina was part of the Viceroyalty of the Río de la Plata, part of the Spanish Empire.

Events
In 1800, Argentina was performing well economically, slightly wealthier than the United States and Cuba.
The Argentine Army, suspicious of invasion, increases its force to 14,141 soldiers.

Births
 Dalmacio Vélez Sársfield (February 18, 1800 – June 30, 1875) – lawyer

References

 
Years of the 18th century in Argentina
Argentina
1800s in Argentina